Ochromolopis ithycentra is a moth in the family Epermeniidae. It was described by Edward Meyrick in 1926. It is found in South Africa.

References

Endemic moths of South Africa
Epermeniidae
Moths described in 1926
Lepidoptera of South Africa
Moths of Africa